Cătălina Cășaru (born 26 January 1979) is a Romanian backstroke swimmer. She competed in two events at the 1996 Summer Olympics.

References

External links
 

1979 births
Living people
Romanian female backstroke swimmers
Olympic swimmers of Romania
Swimmers at the 1996 Summer Olympics
Sportspeople from Brăila